John Haley House is a historic home located at High Point, Guilford County, North Carolina. It was built in 1786, and is a small, one-story brick dwelling. It has a gable roof and sits on a stone foundation.  The interior is based on a Quaker plan.  The John Haley House is believed to be the oldest dwelling in High Point.

It was listed on the National Register of Historic Places in 1971.

References

Buildings and structures in High Point, North Carolina
Houses on the National Register of Historic Places in North Carolina
Houses completed in 1786
Houses in Guilford County, North Carolina
National Register of Historic Places in Guilford County, North Carolina